Värnamo Municipality (Värnamo kommun) is a municipality in Jönköping County in southern Sweden, where the town Värnamo is seat.

The municipality was created in 1971, when the City of Värnamo (itself instituted in 1920) was amalgamated with the surrounding rural municipalities to form an entity of unitary type. There are fourteen original units making up the present municipality.

Geography

Governance

Värnamo Municipality has been governed by the Moderate Party, the Centre Party and the Christian Democrats since at least 1994, with the addition of the Liberals in 2002 and the Green Party from 2014 until 2018. The Social Democratic Party has been the largest party every year since the formation of the municipality, with an average of 34 percent of the votes. The Centre Party (of which the national leader, Annie Lööf, is from Värnamo) and the Christian Democrats were unusually strong, and received more than twice as many votes as the national average in the 2018 elections.

References

External links

Värnamo kommun - official website 

Municipalities of Jönköping County